Iuliana Colnic (born 27 July 2004) is a Moldovan footballer who plays as a forward for Moldavian Divizia Nationala club FC Maksimum Cahul and the Moldova women's national team.

References

2004 births
Living people
Moldovan women's footballers
Women's association football forwards
Moldova women's international footballers
Moldovan expatriate footballers
Moldovan expatriate sportspeople in Romania
Expatriate women's footballers in Romania